Adam Marcus may refer to:

 Adam Marcus (director) (born 1968), American film director, writer and actor
 Adam Marcus (mathematician) (born 1979), American mathematician

See also
Marcus Adam (born 1968), retired English sportsperson